Joseph Berlinger (born October 30, 1961) is an American documentary filmmaker and producer. Particularly focused on true crime documentaries, Berlinger's films and docu-series draw attention to social justice issues in the US and abroad in such films as Brother's Keeper, Paradise Lost: The Child Murders at Robin Hood Hills, Crude, Whitey: United States of America v. James J. Bulger and Intent To Destroy: Death, Denial and Depiction.

A 2017 HuffPost article said "Brother's Keeper (1992) and the Paradise Lost trilogy (1996–2011) helped pioneer the style of documentary filmmaking [seen] in Netflix's recent true crime sensation, Making a Murderer—a combination of artful cinematography, a stirring musical soundtrack, and a dramatic narrative structure as compelling as any scripted film."

Berlinger spearheaded and directed two 2019 projects centered on the infamous serial killer Ted Bundy: the Netflix docu-series Conversations with a Killer: The Ted Bundy Tapes, and the drama film Extremely Wicked, Shockingly Evil and Vile, starring Zac Efron.

Early life and education

Berlinger was born to a Jewish family in Bridgeport, Connecticut. He graduated from Colgate University in 1983 with a B.A. in German Language.

Early career 
After graduating from Colgate University, Berlinger took a position working at an advertising agency in Frankfurt, Germany. He soon transitioned into the world of film, working as an apprentice to the iconic documentarians Albert and David Maysles. Joe met his future directing partner, Bruce Sinofsky, while they were both employed by the Maysles. Together they would make their directing debut with the 1992 film Brother's Keeper.

Collaboration with Bruce Sinofsky 
Working as a directing duo, Berlinger and Sinofsky created the landmark documentary Brother's Keeper (1992), which tells the story of Delbert Ward, an uneducated elderly man in Munnsville, New York, who was charged with second-degree murder following the death of his brother William. Film critic Roger Ebert called it "an extraordinary documentary about what happened next, as a town banded together to stop what folks saw as a miscarriage of justice."

The pair went on to direct the Paradise Lost Trilogy--Paradise Lost: The Child Murders at Robin Hood Hills (1996), Paradise Lost 2: Revelations (2000), and Paradise Lost 3: Purgatory (2011), which earned the pair an Academy Award nomination. The trilogy, shot over two decades, focused on the West Memphis Three, a group of teenagers who were wrongfully convicted of the brutal murder of three children. The trilogy raised doubts about the legitimacy of the teenagers' convictions and spurred a movement to release them from prison, where one of the men was awaiting a death sentence. In 2011, the West Memphis Three were released from their respective death and life sentences after filing an Alford Plea with the Federal Court of Arkansas.

Metallica: Some Kind of Monster (2004), called "one of the most revelatory rock portraits ever made" follows the popular heavy metal band Metallica. Berlinger and Sinofsky capture the group at a crossroads, as bassist Jason Newsted quits the band and frontman James Hetfield abruptly leaves to enter a rehabilitation facility due to alcohol abuse. The film was critically acclaimed for capturing Metallica, a global phenomenon, at a moment of true vulnerability.

Sinofsky died on February 21, 2015, at the age of 58, from diabetes-related complications. The band Metallica paid tribute to him as a "courageous man with deep empathy and wisdom who wasn't afraid to dig deep to tell the story." Berlinger wrote that Sinofsky's "humanity is on every frame of the films that he leaves behind."

Other works

Film 
Berlinger made his narrative feature debut with Book of Shadows: Blair Witch 2 (2000).

Berlinger's film Crude (2009) focused on the lawsuit by Ecuadorean plaintiffs against Chevron Corporation, for its alleged responsibility for continuing sites of pollution in that country. Under African Skies (2012), follows Paul Simon as he returns to South Africa for a reunion concert, celebrating the 25th anniversary of his landmark album Graceland which featured many iconic South African Musicians. In 2014 Whitey: United States of America V. James J. Bulger, a documentary about the infamous Boston mob boss Whitey Bulger was released. Berlinger traces Whitey's trail of terror as well as the FBI's role in both enabling him and taking him down.

Berlinger captured Tony Robbins' exclusive and notoriously private Date With Destiny seminar in his 2016 film Tony Robbins: I Am Not Your Guru. Berlinger chronicles the six-day seminar and the personal evolutions and breakthroughs of participants, Robbins and even Berlinger himself.

In 2017 Berlinger released Intent to Destroy: Death, Denial & Depiction, an examination of the Armenian genocide through both seated interviews with experts and behind-the-scenes footage of Terry George's historical drama The Promise (2016).

In 2019, Berlinger re-entered the world of narrative film and directed Extremely Wicked, Shockingly Evil and Vile, his second feature. The film chronicles the life of serial killer Ted Bundy and his longtime girlfriend Elizabeth Kendall. Starring Zac Efron, Lily Collins, Jim Parsons, John Malkovich, Jeffrey Donovan, Haley Joel Osment and Angela Sarafyan, the film screened at the 2019 Sundance Film Festival in January.

Television
, Joe Berlinger has directed 15 documentary series for television, including Oprah's Master Class (2011–2012), Iconoclasts (2005–2012), The System With Joe Berlinger (2014), Killing Richard Glossip (2017), Gone: The Forgotten Women of Ohio (2017), and Cold Blooded: The Clutter Family Murders (2017). Berlinger has three television projects slated for release in 2018: Unspeakable Crime: The Burning of Jessica Chambers (NBC/Oxygen), Wrong Man (STARZ), and a special fifth episode of Killing Richard Glossip (Discovery ID).

Literature and philanthropy 
In collaboration with journalist Greg Milner, Berlinger wrote the book Metallica: This Monster Lives (2004), about his early career, accomplishments and challenges forging his path in the world of film. The book is centered around the filming of Metallica: Some Kind of Monster.

Berlinger serves on the board of Proclaim Justice, a nonprofit dedicated to providing resources and building awareness around wrongful convictions. He also serves on the board of Rehabilitation Through the Arts, The Bedford Playhouse and the International Documentary Association.

Legal battles over Crude
Chevron Corporation subpoenaed the outtakes from Berlinger's 2009 film Crude. Berlinger fought the request, citing reporters' privilege, but in 2010 a federal judge ordered Berlinger to turn over more than 600 hours of footage created during the film's production. Berlinger appealed, but in 2011 the US 2nd Circuit Court of Appeals upheld the lower court ruling against Berlinger, though with a slight reduction in the total hours of footage required.

After spending $1.3 million on legal fees on the case, Berlinger expressed concerns about being able to make documentaries about legal cases in the future.

Paradise Lost
Berlinger is best known for the film series Paradise Lost, which documents the murder trial and the subsequent legal battles of three Arkansas teenagers, Damien Echols, Jason Baldwin and Jessie Misskelley Jr.,  convicted of murder. The court convicted the youths (known as the West Memphis Three) of murdering three eight-year-old boys as part of a "ritual killing," although no physical evidence linked the three young men to the crime. Paradise Lost documents the 20-year ordeal of these three young men from arrest to conviction, through years of unsuccessful legal efforts, to a plea bargain that resulted in their release in the summer of 2012.

The film series brought mainstream attention to the case, and many celebrities took up the cause of getting these young men out of prison and getting Damien Echols off death row. The mainstream attention, brought on by the documentary series, allowed for a well-financed legal team to investigate every lead in the case. These subsequent investigations showed the incompetence of the West Memphis police, who had never dealt with this type of crime, and that the police let other suspects disappear from the community; for example, a man covered in blood used a restroom in a restaurant within walking distance of the murder scene shortly after the time of the murders. In addition to the failure to apprehend the suspect, the police lost the blood samples, even though this strange man left blood all over the bathroom. This mistake meant that the experts could never determine if this strange man was covered in the victims' blood.

Ultimately, the defense team hired DNA experts to test genetic material after fighting the prosecution for years to get access to it, and these tests again proved that no physical evidence linked the West Memphis Three to the murders; rather, a hair from one boy's stepfather was found tied into one of the shoelaces used to hogtie the victims.

After a 2010 decision by the Arkansas Supreme Court regarding newly produced DNA evidence, attorneys for the West Memphis Three negotiated with prosecutors an Alford plea allowing them to assert their innocence while acknowledging enough evidence to convict them; the result, on August 19, 2011, was acceptance of the pleas by Judge David Laser, and his reduction of sentence of the three to time served, and their release with 10-year suspended sentences (after 18 years, 78 days in prison).

Personal life
Joe Berlinger lives with his wife, artist Loren Eiferman, in Westchester County, New York.

Filmography 
Films

Documentary films

Documentary series

References

External links

"Q&A: Paradise Lost directors Joe Berlinger and Bruce Sinofsky", Grantland.com

Living people
1961 births
21st-century American Jews
21st-century American writers
American documentary filmmakers
American male writers
Colgate University alumni
Directors Guild of America Award winners
Film directors from Connecticut
Jewish American writers
People associated with true crime
Writers from Bridgeport, Connecticut